The 1906 Chicago Physicians and Surgeons football team represented the College of Physicians and Surgeons of Chicago (P&S) in the 1906 college football season.  The team played at least two contests, against an undefeated Notre Dame, and Chicago Veterinary College.

Schedule

References

Chicago Physicians and Surgeons
Chicago Physicians and Surgeons football seasons
Chicago Physicians and Surgeons football